Eutrochium steelei, also known as Appalachian Joe-Pye weed or Steele's eupatorium, is a North American species of plants in the family Asteraceae. It is found only in the Appalachian Mountains of the eastern United States, in the States of Virginia, Kentucky, Tennessee, North Carolina, and Georgia.

Stems are greenish-purple, not hollow. One plant can produce many small pink or purple flower heads, each head with 5-10 disc flowers but no ray flowers.

See also
Edward Strieby Steele

References

External links

steelei
Flora of the Appalachian Mountains
Plants described in 1990